Stephan Koranyi (13 September 1956 – 11 September 2021) was a German philologist, author, lecturer, and an editor.

In 1985 he was an editor of the novel Gabriele written by Johanna Schopenhauer and in 1987 he edited the novel Laudin und die Seinen. Both books were published by German publishing company dtv (Deutscher Taschenbuch Verlag).

Works
In addition to his work in German studies as a lecturer, Koranyi examined German literature in terms of genre, form, content, and motifs as well as looking at it historically by author and epoch, (especially on Goethe), beyond that as an expert of German Christmas culture he has published the following titles: Reclams Weihnachtsbuch. Erzählungen, Lieder, Gedichte, Briefe, Betrachtungen" Stuttgart: Reclam (1988), Weihnachtsgedichte (2003); Weihnachtszauber Winternacht. Geschichten und Gedichte (2005), and Und das schönste Fest ist da. Weihnachtliche Gedichte (2005), Gedichte zur Weihnacht (2009), Weihnachten. Gedichte (2011); Fröhliches Fest. Weihnachtsgeschichten (2012).

Koranyi acted as an editor for the German publishing house Reclam since 1988. He has published more than a dozen books, mostly of German short stories and poetry.

Publications (selection)

Publications (as an editor) 
 "Gabriele" (Novel) by Johanna Schopenhauer (München: Deutscher Taschenbuch Verlag, 1985) 
 "Laudin und die Seinen" (Novel) by Jakob Wassermann (München:  Deutscher Taschenbuch Verlag, 1987)

Publications (as an editor) 
 Reclams Weihnachtsbuch. Erzählungen, Lieder, Gedichte, Briefe, Betrachtungen (Stuttgart: Reclam, 1988) 
 Heiteres Darüberstehen. Geschichten und Gedichte zum Vergnügen (Stuttgart: Reclam, 1990) 
 Liebe, Liebe, Liebe. Geschichten, Gedichte und Gedanken (Stuttgart: Reclam, 1991)
 Weihnachtsgedichte (Stuttgart: Reclam, 2003) 
 Weihnachtszauber Winternacht. Geschichten und Gedichte (Stuttgart: Reclam, 2005) 
 Und das schönste Fest ist da. Weihnachtliche Gedichte (Stuttgart: Reclam, 2005) 
 Alles Gute. Heitere Geschichten (Stuttgart: Reclam, 2007) 
 Gedichte zur Weihnacht (Stuttgart: Reclam, 2009) 
 Weihnachten. Gedichte (Stuttgart: Reclam, 2011) 
 Fröhliches Fest. Weihnachtsgeschichten, mit Gabriele Seifert (Stuttgart: Reclam, 2012) 
 Immer heiter auf der Leiter. Geschichten, mit Gabriele Seifert (Stuttgart: Reclam, 2013) 
 Reclams Adeventskalender, mit Gabriele Seifert (Stuttgart: Reclam, 2014) 
 Gute Tage – schöne Stunden: Feriengeschichten, mit Gabriele Seifert (Stuttgart: Reclam, 2014) 
 Weihnachtsüberraschung: Geschichten, mit Gabriele Seifert (Stuttgart: Reclam, 2015) 
 "Verspätung! Geschichten für wenn's mal wieder länger dauert, with Gabriele Seifert (Stuttgart: Reclam, 2015) 
 Weihnachten auf Besuch, with Gabriele Seifert (Stuttgart: Reclam, 2016) 
 Weihnachtsgedichte, (Ditzingen: Reclam, 2017) 
 Stille Nacht und Feuerwerk: Geschichten und Gedichte, mit Gabriele Seifert (Ditzingen: Reclam, 2017) 
 Reclams Adventskalender, mit Gabriele Seifert (Ditzingen: Reclam, 2017) 
 Frühling für Fortgeschrittene: Geschichten, mit Gabriele Seifert (Ditzingen: Reclam, 2017) 
 Reclams Weihnachtsbuch: Gedichte, Geschichten und Lieder, (Ditzingen: Reclam, 2019)

Other works (selection) 
 Gedanken sind Kräfte. Bibelworte – Worte zur Bibel (Stuttgart: Reclam, 2007)

References

External links 
 
 Prokurist Dr. Stephan Koranyi

1956 births
2021 deaths
German philologists
German editors
20th-century German novelists
Modernist writers
German male novelists
20th-century German male writers